Jill of the Jungle is a trilogy of scrolling platform video games released in 1992 by Epic MegaGames. It was intended to rival platform games previously released as shareware by id Software and Apogee Software.  The three episodes in the trilogy are Jill of the Jungle, Jill Goes Underground, and Jill Saves the Prince. Though each game was released separately, the three were combined into Jill of the Jungle: The Complete Trilogy a year later.

Gameplay

Jill of the Jungle is a platform game. The player controls the eponymous Jill and is able to run, jump, and fire various weapons collected within each level such as a dagger or spiral blade. Each level is populated with monsters and puzzles to challenge the player. Several levels include special features that allow the player to transform Jill into other forms with special types of movement such as the flying phoenix bird, jumping frog, and swimming fish. Other levels involve switches, keys and other challenges the player must overcome to finish the level. Upon finishing a level, the player is returned to the map level. The map level itself is organized in a way that requires the player to complete certain levels before they can proceed to the next area.

The first episode features 14 levels (including an ending level) and two bonus levels all linked together by a map level, as well as two finish levels where you're passive. The second episode does not have a map level, and instead features 19 consecutive levels and an ending level. The third and final episode has a different style of map level, an overhead view, that is a significant departure from the first two episodes.

Development

Tim Sweeney was inspired to create a Nintendo-style game featuring a female protagonist as a distinguishing feature. The game started out as a platforming level editor. Lacking the skills to do the art and music, Sweeney hired four people. Sweeney claimed Jill of the Jungle was the "last game [he] designed."

Jill of the Jungle: The Complete Trilogy was released for free at GOG.com on November 2, 2018.

Reception
Shortly after its release, Jill of the Jungle sold 20 to 30 copies daily.

Legacy
A sequel, Jill of the Jungle II, was being produced at a point. However, its developers decided to change it into an original property, titled Vinyl Goddess from Mars, which was published by Union Logic in 1995.

References

External links
 Download the first episode 
 
 Jill of the Jungle page at the Game Modding Wiki
 

1992 video games
DOS games
Epic Games games
episodic video games
freeware games
games commercially released with DOSBox
jungle girls
Side-scrolling platform games
single-player video games
trilogies
video games developed in the United States
video games featuring female protagonists